The Marie Webster House, also known as George Webster Jr. and Marie Daugherty House, is a historic house at 926 South Washington Street in Marion, Indiana.  Built in 1905, it was the home of quilter Marie Webster (1859-1956) from 1909 until 1942, and is now home to the Quilters Hall of Fame.  It was declared a National Historic Landmark in 1993, honoring Webster's role in promoting and broadening interest and knowledge of the craft.

The Quilters Hall of Fame is a non-profit organization dedicated to honoring those who have made outstanding contributions to the world of quilting.  Founded in 1979 by Hazel McDowell Carter, the Hall features a museum with exhibits of quilts and quilt-makers.

Description and history
The Marie Webster House stands south of the Marion town center, on the west side of South Washington Street between 9th and 10th Streets.  It is a -story wood-frame structure with Colonial Revival styling that is not architecturally distinguished.  The building's interior has retained features and finishes original to the period of the Webster's ownership, despite its initial conversion to apartments and its present use as a museum.  Marie Webster displayed quilts and patterns to customers in the second-floor sitting room.

Marie Webster did not begin making quilts until 1909, when she was fifty years old.  In her childhood she had learned, sewing, embroidery, and needlework, but she did not become an aficionado of quilting until later in her life.  Her critical contribution to the craft was in bringing the craft to a broad national audience, when it had previously been a largely regional practice.  Her 1915 publication Quilts: Their Story and How to Make Them was a seminal work in this respect, and remains an influence on the field to this day.  She introduced the practice of selling quilting patterns, kits with precut fabrics, as well as partially and completely finished quilts.  She ran her business, the Practical Patchwork Company, out of this house, until her retirement in 1942.

The house was purchased by neighbors, who converted it to apartments.  After standing vacant for several years, it was condemned by the city in 1990.  It was rescued from demolition by Webster's granddaughter, who purchased it and gave it as site for the Quilter's Hall of Fame.

Quilters Hall of Fame honorees

References

External links

Hall of Fame website

Houses completed in 1905
Halls of fame in Indiana
Houses in Grant County, Indiana
Marion, Indiana
Museums in Grant County, Indiana
National Historic Landmarks in Indiana
National Register of Historic Places in Grant County, Indiana
Quilt museums in the United States
Textile museums in the United States
Folk art museums and galleries in Indiana
Houses on the National Register of Historic Places in Indiana
1905 establishments in Indiana